Earl Cole (born April 9, 1971, in Kansas City, Kansas) is an entrepreneur, producer, philanthropist, television personality, and former California advertising executive. He is well known as the $1 million winner on the reality television series Survivor: Fiji.

Survivor
Cole was originally recruited for The Amazing Race with his girlfriend; however, after she dropped out, he was transferred to Survivor three days before filming, having only seen a single episode of the show. Upon arriving in Fiji, he identified Yau-Man Chan as a person similar to himself with the best combination of intelligence and integrity and formed an alliance with Chan that lasted until the Final Four. Cole became the strategic leader of the core Ravu Alliance, where he targeted weak links Jessica deBen and Sylvia Kwan (he was not there for the Tribal Council where Erica Durousseau was voted out). His tribe was granted a reprieve, when the rival Moto tribe chose to go to Tribal Council. His alliance returned to Tribal Council in the next episode where Rita Verreos was voted off. In a tribal swap, he, Chan, and Michelle Yi were moved to Moto with Stacy Kimball, Kenward "Boo" Bernis, and Cassandra Franklin. He lost Yi at the merge, when she was at Tribal Council without her alliance. At the Final Nine, Cole was able to recruit the original Moto outsiders, Franklin and Andria "Dreamz" Herd, and New Moto outsiders, Kimball and Bernis. The Alliance of Six picked off the Horsemen: Edgardo Rivera, Mookie Lee, and finally Alex Angarita. A coup started by Herd to evict Chan failed, and Kimball was voted out (via Immunity Idol). Chan won Immunity on Day 37, and Bernis was voted off. Cole and Chan cooperated over the course of the game to discover two hidden immunity idols from information that they discovered on several independent visits to Exile Island. Cole visited Exile Island more than anyone that season (four times). When Herd reneged on a deal with Chan for immunity at the penultimate Tribal Council, Chan was eliminated; Cole allowed Chan to be voted out, recognizing that Chan would be very hard to beat at the Final Tribal Council. At the Final Tribal Council, Cole became the jury's unanimous vote to become the 14th Sole Survivor. He made it through the entire season having never won an individual immunity and having had only one Tribal Council vote cast against him. He became the first unanimous winner of Survivor, with a vote of 9–0–0.

After Survivor: Fiji
Cole has hosted or appeared on several talk shows, including CBS's The Early Show, Live with Regis and Kelly, BET's 106 & Park and MTV Fuse. He was also voted as one of People'''s Sexiest Bachelors in 2007, and also hosted shows on the TV Guide Channel, a Canadian reality show in 2009 and the Style Network in 2010 (where his luxurious, beach wedding, at the St. Regis Princeville, in Kauai, Hawaii, was featured on Whose Wedding Is It Anyway?). He has traveled to more than 40 countries and has been featured in various domestic and international magazines from Australia to South Africa. Cole has also been interviewed by the foreign press, appearing on television in Hong Kong, China, South Africa, Singapore, The Bahamas and Australia.

Cole founded a creative management company that has booked various reality television participants and artists to participate in worldwide military tours with Armed Forces Entertainment (Asia, South Pacific, Europe and Diego Garcia). He has worked with celebrities from Survivor, The Amazing Race, American Idol, So You Think You Can Dance and Big Brother. Cole, who is also a musician/composer/songwriter, served as tour manager for a multi-city concert tour of Japan, in 2011, which featured a cast from various seasons of American Idol. He helped arrange a private show for the children of Misawa Air Base in Japan, the closest base to the 2011 Tōhoku earthquake and tsunami disaster epicenter.

Cole has an endowment with the University of Kansas Medical Center, where he established the Perthes Kids Foundation (Earl Cole Fund), a global charitable foundation for children with Legg-Calve-Perthes Disease, a rare hip bone disease Cole suffered from as a child. Now a global organization located in four countries, USA, UK, Australia and Colombia, Cole serves as Founder, CEO and Chairman of the Board.

Cole was considered to return for Survivor: Micronesia, Heroes vs. Villains, Blood vs. Water, and Game Changers. He was also recently considered for Winners at War, but had to decline due to family matters.

In 2020, Cole co-founded startup company The Smart Tire Company with blockchain engineer Brian Yennie. On March 16, 2021, the company revealed its first product called METL tire, a bicycle tire made of airless aluminum alloy based on shape-memory alloy (SMA) technology from NASA engineers used on martian and lunar rovers. Smart plans on introducing the METL bicycle tire to the general public in early 2022, with tires for the automotive and commercial vehicle industries planning on being introduced sometime afterward. Cole and Yennie appeared on an episode of the thirteenth season of Shark Tank, which aired on January 7, 2022, to seek an investment for The SMART Tire Company. That same year, Cole competed on the USA Network reality competition series, Snake in the Grass''.

References

External links
Earl Cole bio for Survivor: Fiji at CBS.com

1971 births
Winners in the Survivor franchise
African-American television personalities
Living people
People from Kansas City, Kansas
Survivor (American TV series) winners
21st-century African-American people
20th-century African-American people